Tricholaena is a genus of Asian, African, and Italian plants in the grass family.

 Species
 Tricholaena capensis (Licht. ex Roem. & Schult.) Nees - Free State, Namibia, Cape Province
 Tricholaena monachne (Trin.) Stapf & C.E.Hubb. - drier parts of Africa from Kenya to Cape Province; also Ghana, Togo, Madagascar, Réunion, Pakistan
 Tricholaena teneriffae (L.f.) Link - drier parts of Africa from Morocco to Egypt to Tanzania; Canary Islands; Cape Verde, Arabian Peninsula, Middle East, India, Pakistan, Calabria, Sicily
 Tricholaena vestita (Balf.f.) Stapf & C.E.Hubb. - Socotra

 formerly included
see Brachiaria Digitaria Eriachne Melinis Miscanthus Paspalum Saccharum

References

Panicoideae
Poaceae genera
Grasses of Africa
Grasses of Asia
Grasses of Europe